Victim is a 1961 British neo noir suspense film directed by Basil Dearden and starring Dirk Bogarde and Sylvia Syms. It premiered in the UK on 31 August 1961 and in the US the following February. On its release in the United Kingdom, it proved highly controversial to the British Board of Film Censors, and in the U.S. it was refused a seal of approval from the American Motion Picture Production Code. Despite this the film received acclaim and is now regarded as a British classic, as well as having been credited for liberalizing attitudes towards homosexuality in Great Britain.

Plot 
A successful barrister, Melville Farr, has a thriving London practice. He is on course to become a Queen's Counsel and people are already talking of him being appointed a judge. He is apparently happily married to his wife, Laura.

Farr is approached by Jack "Boy" Barrett, a young working class gay man with whom Farr has a romantic friendship. Farr rebuffs the approach, thinking Barrett wants to blackmail him about their relationship. In fact, Barrett has been trying to reach Farr to appeal to him for help because he has fallen prey to blackmailers who have a picture of Farr and Barrett in a vehicle together, in which Barrett is crying with Farr's arm around him. Barrett has stolen £2,300 (£ today) from his employers to pay the blackmail, is being pursued by the police, and needs Farr's financial assistance to flee the country. After Farr intentionally avoids him, Barrett is picked up by the police, who discover why he was being blackmailed. Knowing it will be only a matter of time before he is forced to reveal the details of the blackmail scheme and Farr's role, Barrett hangs himself in a police cell.

Learning the truth about Barrett, Farr takes on the blackmail ring and recruits a friend of Barrett to identify others the blackmailers may be targeting. The friend identifies a barber who is being blackmailed, but the barber refuses to identify his tormentors. When one of the blackmailers visits the barber and begins to destroy his shop, he suffers a heart attack. Near death, he calls Farr's house and leaves a mumbled message that names another victim of the blackmailers.

Farr contacts this victim, a famous actor, but the actor refuses to help him, preferring to pay the blackmailers to keep his sexuality secret. Laura finds out about Barrett's suicide and confronts her husband. After a heated argument, during which Farr maintains that he has kept the promise he made to Laura when they married that he would no longer indulge his homosexual attraction, Laura decides that Farr has betrayed that promise in having a relationship with Barrett, and decides to leave him.

The blackmailers vandalise Farr's Chiswick property, painting "FARR IS QUEER" on his garage door. Farr resolves to help the police catch them and promises to give evidence in court despite knowing that the ensuing press coverage will certainly destroy his career. The blackmailers are identified and arrested. Farr tells Laura to leave before the ugliness of the trial, but that he will welcome her return afterward. She tells him that she believes she has found the strength to return to him. Farr burns the suggestive photograph of him and Barrett.

Cast

Background and production 

Homosexual acts between males were illegal in England and Wales until the 1967 Sexual Offences Act, which implemented the recommendations of the Wolfenden report published a decade earlier. The fact that willing participants in consensual homosexual acts could be prosecuted made them vulnerable to entrapment, and the criminalisation of homosexuality was known as the "blackmailer's charter". Homosexuals were prosecuted and tabloid newspapers covered the court proceedings. By 1960, however, the police demonstrated little enthusiasm for prosecuting homosexual relations. There was an inclination to "turn a blind eye" to homosexuality, because there was a feeling that the legal code violated basic liberties. However, public opprobrium, even in the absence of criminal prosecution, continued to require homosexuals to keep their identity secret and made them vulnerable to blackmail. The film treats homosexuality in a non-sensationalised manner.

Scriptwriter Janet Green had previously collaborated with Basil Dearden on a British "social problem" film, Sapphire, which had dealt with racism against Afro-Caribbean immigrants to the United Kingdom in the late 1950s. After reading the Wolfenden report and, knowing of several high-profile prosecutions of gay men, she became a keen supporter of homosexual law reform. She wrote the screenplay with her husband John McCormick. Despite its then controversial subject, it was in other respects quite conventional in being quite chaste. Farr has not had sex with Barrett, nor with the man he loved at university. The audience is allowed just one glimpse of a photo of two heads: Farr and Barrett seen from the obverse of the print, and the screenplay underscores the fact that only Barrett's tears suggest anything untoward, along with the breaking of social taboos in that they are different classes and far apart in age. In addition, the film promises that Farr and Laura will remain united and faithful to one another. As Pauline Kael wrote: 

The language the screenplay used to describe its controversial subject attracted comment. It used "the familiar colloquial terms", wrote one reviewer without specifying them, even as he referred to "homosexuality", "the abnormality", and "the condition". The term "queer" – then a pejorative term not yet adopted by advocates for LGBT rights – is used several times in the film. "FARR IS QUEER" is painted on Farr's garage door. Farr and other characters use the term. The more polite "invert" appears as well.

When the team of producer Michael Relph and director Basil Dearden first approached Bogarde, several actors had already turned down the role, including Jack Hawkins, James Mason, and Stewart Granger. In 1960, Bogarde was 39 and just about the most popular actor in British films. He had spent fourteen years being cast as a matinée idol by The Rank Organisation. He had proven himself playing war heroes (The Sea Shall Not Have Them; Ill Met by Moonlight); he was the star of the hugely successful Doctor film series; and he was a reliable romantic lead in films like A Tale of Two Cities. He was flirting with a larger, Hollywood career by playing Liszt in Song Without End. British audiences had named him their favourite British film star for years.

Bogarde was suspected to be homosexual, lived in the same house as his business manager, Anthony Forwood, and was compelled to be seen occasionally in public with attractive young women. He seems not to have hesitated to accept the role of Farr, a married lawyer with a homosexual past that he has not quite put behind him. Bogarde himself wrote the scene in which Farr admits to his wife that he is gay and has continued to be attracted to other men, despite his earlier assurances to the contrary.

Of his first independent film project in his 34th film, Bogarde said in 1965, "For the first time I was playing my own age. At Rank, the fixed rule was that I had to look pretty. Victim ended all that nonsense." He wrote years later in his autobiography that his father had suggested he do The Mayor of Casterbridge, "But I did Victim instead, ... playing the barrister with the loving wife, a loyal housekeeper, devoted secretary and the Secret Passion. It was the wisest decision I ever made in my cinematic life. It is extraordinary, in this over-permissive age [c. 1988], to believe that this modest film could ever have been considered courageous, daring or dangerous to make. It was, in its time, all three."

Similarly, though several actresses had turned down the role, Sylvia Syms readily accepted the part of Laura. English film critic Mark Kermode notes her reasons for this included previous theatre work with John Gielgud which exposed her to the laws surrounding homosexuality at the time, and that a family friend of hers had committed suicide after being accused of being gay. Consequently, she felt that the film's story had to be told. Other gay cast members included Dennis Price and Hilton Edwards.

A number of actresses turned down the part of Bogarde's wife before Syms accepted.

Filming
Syms later recalled that filming had to be completed in just ten days. Shooting locations included The Salisbury, a pub on St Martin's Lane in the Covent Garden area of London. The project was originally entitled Boy Barrett and the name changed to Victim late in production. Relph and Dearden acknowledged that the film was designed to be "an open protest against Britain's law that being a homosexual is a criminal act".

Censor reaction

British censor 
An official of the British Board of Film Censors (BBFC) had set out its view of homosexuality in film: "to the great majority of cinema-goers, homosexuality is outside their direct experience and is something which is shocking, distasteful and disgusting". Relph said that in Victim, by contrast: "What I think we want to say is that the homosexual, although subject to a psychological or glandular variation from sexual normality, is a human being subject to all the emotions of other human beings, and as deserving of our understanding. Unless he sets out to corrupt others, it is wrong for the law to pillory him because of his inversion." He said Victim was "a story not of glands but of love."

Although a number of controversial scenes were cut before the film's release during discussions with the BBFC, including scenes with teenagers. the BBFC nevertheless gave the film an "X" rating; that is, "recommended for adults only", a classification which was then usually given to erotica or horror films. In a letter to the filmmakers, the BBFC secretary raised four objections to the film. First, a male character says of another man: "I wanted him". Second, references to "self-control" in the revised script were omitted from the filmed discussion of homosexuality, leaving the discussion "without sufficient counterbalance". Third, the film implies that homosexuality is a choice, which "is a dangerous idea to put into the minds of adolescents who see the film". Finally, the one blackmailer who unleashes a tirade against homosexuality is so unsympathetic that the views expressed will be discredited.

U.S. censor
In the United States, the Motion Picture Association of America's Production Code Administration, the film industry's self-censorship board that enforced the guidelines established by the Motion Picture Production Code, denied Victim its seal of approval. A spokesperson cited the film's "candid and clinical discussion of homosexuality" and its "overtly expressed pleas for social acceptance of the homosexual, to the extent that he be made socially tolerable". He noted that the subject of homosexuality was acceptable under the recently relaxed Production Code if handled with "care, discretion and restraint".

The head of the U.S. distributor appealed the decision and announced the film would be released in February even if his appeal was denied. He described it as a "tasteful film on a delicate subject". A few years before the release of Victim, the filmmakers of Suddenly, Last Summer (1959) had persuaded the code censors to allow their film to use homosexuality as a plot device, but only by presenting it through cryptic innuendos, and film had to illustrate the "horrors of such a lifestyle". Victim, in contrast, was deemed to be too frank in its treatment of homosexuality, and not initially approved by the censorship code.

However, in 1962, the Hollywood Production Code agreed to lift the ban on films using homosexuality as a plot device. A few years later, the code was replaced by the MPAA film rating system, which introduced an age-appropriate classification system for films. As attitudes became more liberal, the rating classifications for the film were revised.

When Victim was released on VHS in the U.S. in 1986, it received the PG-13 rating. When Victim was re-released in the United Kingdom, it was reclassified with the much milder PG/12 rating.

Reception
Victim premiered at the Odeon Cinema in Leicester Square on 31 August 1961. The U.S. premiere followed at two theaters in New York on February 5, 1962.

It was the only British entry in the Venice Film Festival in 1961, where an Italian critic commented: "at last the British have stopped being hypocrites".

Critical reception
British reviews praised Bogarde's performance as his best and praised his courage in taking on the role. A London magazine called it "the most startlingly outspoken film Britain has ever produced". An anonymous reviewer in The Times commented that "Victim may not say a great deal about" the related issues of the nature of 'love' and gay men's "genuine feeling" for each other, "but what it does say is reasoned and just; and it does invite a compassionate consideration of this particular form of human bondage". However the Sight and Sound reviewer Terence Kelly saw problems with the film, and wrote that Victim contains "a tour of the more respectable parts of the London homosexual underworld, with glimpses of the ways in which different men cope with or are destroyed by their abnormality". He did comment "the film unequivocally condemns the way" blackmail "is encouraged by the present state of the law".

Bosley Crowther wrote that the film "appears more substantial and impressive than its dramatic content justifies" because "it deals with a subject that heretofore has been studiously shied away from or but cautiously hinted at on the commercial screen". He thought the script "routine" and "shoddily constructed" as drama but successful as a political argument:

He qualified his praise of Bogarde's acting: "Dirk Bogarde does a strong, forceful, forthright job, with perhaps a little too much melancholy and distress in his attitude, now and again." He summed up his mixed view: "While the subject is disagreeable, it is not handled distastefully. And while the drama is not exciting, it has a definite intellectual appeal."

Chris Waters however has argued that "Victim took for granted that homosexuality was a social problem that needed to be explored calmly and dispassionately" as a result of the "wake of the social dislocations associated with the war and the various anxieties to which they gave rise". He elaborates on this further by referring to Kenneth Soddy, a physician at the Department of Psychological Medicine at University College London Hospital, who wrote in 1954 that whilst homosexuality itself didn't trouble the community, its "social disturbance" during the war caused "variations in social and sexual practices which engenders attacks of acute public anxiety." As such, he argues that the film portrays homosexuality in a sensationalised way which would have deliberately drawn public attention to the issue.

Before the film was released in the U.S., a news report in The New York Times described Victim as a political work: "the movie is a dramatized condemnation, based on the Wolfenden Report, of Britain's laws on homosexuality."

In relation to a BFI Southbank retrospective screening season of Bogarde's films, Peter Bradshaw argues that fifty years on, Victim does not function necessarily "as a study of homosexuality," but rather of "blackmail and paranoia." He points out the fact that Melville never engages in homosexual acts, but rather "appears" to have a "passionate, unconsummated infatuation with a young man at university..." then later a liaison with a "young building-site worker", both unconsummated arrangements to prove his interest. He argues Bogarde's lighting is more haunting than necessary in the confrontation scenes with his wife, and references the work of Patrick Hamilton, which often depicted "the seedy, nasty world of pubs and drinking holes around... London's West End", seen throughout the film that add to "the strange, occult world of blackmail, conspiracy and shame, and the seediness of a certain type of London, that Victim holds up best."

Victim became a highly sociologically significant film; many believe it played an influential role in liberalising attitudes and the laws in Britain regarding homosexuality. Alan Burton has also highlighted that in spite of attracting "much criticism and debate, largely in terms of its liberal prescriptions and its ‘timid’ handling of a controversial theme", confirmed in that a study that Victim had "significant impact on gay men who struggled with their identity and subjectivity at a time when their sexuality was potentially illegal".

Box office
The film was not a major hit, but it was popular, and by 1971, it had earned an estimated profit of £51,762.

Home media 
The film was released as a DVD by the Criterion Collection in January 2011, as part of an "Eclipse" box set. The film was released as a Blu-ray by Network in July 2014.

Adaptations
The film was adapted as a novel of the same name by Arthur Calder-Marshall, who wrote under the name William Drummond. It was commissioned by the producers and was a typical way of marketing a film in the era before home video. It differed in details (Farr is Carr in the book) and sometimes characters are somewhat transformed. The novel, for example, provides a rationale for one of the blackmailer's hatred of gays, and Carr wonders if he married Laura because she closely resembles her brother, with whom Carr has long been "sentimentally in love".

In July 2017, marking the 50th anniversary of the Sexual Offences Act, BBC Radio 3 broadcast a play dramatising the making of the film, with Ed Stoppard as Bogarde.

See also 

 Different from the Others (Anders als die Andern) (1919), a German film precursor of Victim
 The Children's Hour (1961), a film involving charges of lesbianism
 List of lesbian, gay, bisexual or transgender-related films

References

Further reading 
 John Coldstream, Victim: BFI Film Classics: British Film Institute/Palgrave-Macmillan: 2011: .
 Richard Dyer, "Victim: Hegemonic Project" in Richard Dyer: The Matter of Images: Essays on Representation: London: Routledge: 2002.
 Patrick Higgins, Heterosexual Dictatorship: Male Homosexuality in Postwar Britain: London: Fourth Estate: 1996: 
 Philip Kemp, "I Wanted Him: Revival: Victim" Sight and Sound 15:8 (August 2005): 10.
 Vito Russo, The Celluloid Closet: Homosexuality in the Movies (NY: Harper & Row, 1987)
Parker Tyler, Screening the Sexes: Homosexuality in the Movies (NY: Holt Rinehart & Winston, 1972)
 Andrew Watson, "Shifting Attitudes on Homosexuality" History Today: 65.20 (September/October 2011): 15–17.

External links 

Victim at 60: the heartbreaking gay drama that pushed boundaries – The Guardian

1961 films
1961 crime drama films
1961 LGBT-related films
British black-and-white films
British crime drama films
British LGBT-related films
Censored films
Films directed by Basil Dearden
Films set in London
Films shot at Pinewood Studios
Gay-related films
1960s English-language films
1960s British films